Sosefo Fifita (born 8 January 2003) is a New Zealand professional rugby league footballer who plays as a er or  for the Gold Coast Titans in the NRL.

Background
Fifita is the son of former Tongan rugby star Pila Fifita. His second cousin, David Fifita, also plays for the Gold Coast Titans. Sosefo attended The Southport School where played rugby union in the prestigious GPS competition and would score four tries in a single game with Wallabies Head Coach Dave Rennie in attendance. Fifita is also a former U15 national junior sprint champion over 100 metres.

Playing career

2022
In June 2022, Fifita was selected for the Queensland Maroons U19s, starting at left centre in 32–4 loss to New South Wales Blues U19s. In round 18 of the 2022 NRL season, Fifita made his first grade debut for the Gold Coast against Brisbane, which the club lost 16–12.

References

External links
Gold Coast Titans profile

2003 births
Living people
New Zealand rugby league players
New Zealand sportspeople of Tongan descent
Gold Coast Titans players
Rugby league players from Dunedin